The Gamblers (French: Les joueurs), is a French comedy film from 1950, directed by Claude Barma, and starring Louis de Funès. It is an adaptation of Nikolai Gogol's comedy The Gamblers  (1836).

Cast 
 Louis de Funès: Piotr Petrovitch Shvokhniev
 Jacques Morel: Uteshitelny Stepan Ivanovich
 Pierre Gallon: Alexandr Mikhailovich Glov jr.
 Jacques Grello
 Daniel Lecourtois: Ikhariev
 Alexandre Rignault: Krugel
 Henri Rollan: Mikhail Alexandrovich Glov sr.
 Jean-Marc Tennberg

References

External links 
 
 Les Joueurs at the Films de France

1950 films
French comedy films
1950s French-language films
French black-and-white films
Films based on works by Nikolai Gogol
Films directed by Claude Barma
1950 comedy films
1950s French films